75 may refer to: 

 75 (number)
 one of the years 75 BC, AD 75, 1875 CE, 1975 CE, 2075 CE
 75 (album), an album by Joe Zawinul 
 M75 (disambiguation), including "Model 75"
 Highway 75, see List of highways numbered 75
Alfa Romeo 75, a car produced by Alfa Romeo

See also

 
 
 
 1975 (disambiguation)
 1875 (disambiguation)
 Canon de 75 modèle 1897 (the 75, or, French 75)